Mind Is the Magic: Anthem for the Las Vegas Show is a compilation album by Siegfried & Roy that includes a Michael Jackson song titled "Mind Is the Magic". The album was released on July 10, 2009 by German record label ZYX Music in Europe.

Track listing

Single

The leading track of this album was released as a single in Europe on February 26, 2010, reaching #80 in France on April 3, 2010.

This song was not a new release; it was written by Jackson with Bryan Loren in 1989 for Siegfried & Roy's 'Beyond Belief Show' in Las Vegas. Jackson gave his permission for Siegfried & Roy to release this song in their German album Dreams & Illusions in 1995. The introduction from the song formed part of "The Drill" segment planned for Jackson's This Is It concerts.

Track listing

References

Songs written by Michael Jackson
2009 compilation albums